The 2004–05 VCU Rams men's basketball team represented Virginia Commonwealth University during the 2004–05 NCAA Division I men's basketball season. It was the 37th season of the University fielding a men's basketball program. Led by third-year head coach Jeff Capel III, they continued to play their home games at the Stuart C. Siegel Center. They were a member of the Colonial Athletic Association. They finished the season 19–13, 13–5 in CAA play to finish in a tie for second place. The Rams defeated Delaware and UNC Wilmington in the CAA Tournmanet, before losing to Old Dominion in the final. They received an at-large bid to the NIT where they lost in the opening round to Davidson.

Roster

Schedule 

|-
!colspan=9 style="background:#000000; color:#F8B800;"| Exhibition

|-
!colspan=9 style="background:#000000; color:#F8B800;"| Non-conference regular season
|-

|-

|-

|-

|-

|-

|-

|-

|-

|-

|-
!colspan=6 style=| CAA regular season
|-

|-
!colspan=6 style="background:#000000; color:#F8B800;"| CAA tournament
|-

|-
!colspan=6 style="background:#000000; color:#F8B800;"| NIT
|-

|-
|}

References 
 2004–05 Schedule
 Results

Vcu
VCU Rams men's basketball seasons
Vcu
VCU Rams
VCU Rams